Yasmin Alibhai-Brown (née Damji; born 10 December 1949) is a British journalist and author. A regular columnist for the  i  newspaper and the Evening Standard, she is a well-known commentator on immigration, diversity, and multiculturalism issues.

She is a founding member of British Muslims for Secular Democracy.  She is also a patron of the SI Leeds Literary Prize.

Early life and family
Yasmin Damji was born in 1949 into the Indian community in Kampala, Uganda. Her family belonged to the Nizari Ismaili branch of the Shia Islamic faith, and she regards herself as a Shia Muslim. Her mother was born in East Africa and her father moved there from British India in the 1920s.

After graduating in English literature from Makerere University in 1972, Alibhai-Brown left Uganda for Britain, along with her niece, Farah Damji, shortly before the expulsion of Ugandan Asians by Idi Amin, and completed a Master of Philosophy degree in literature at Linacre College, University of Oxford, in 1975. After working as a teacher, particularly with immigrants and refugees, she moved into journalism in her mid-thirties. 

She is married to Colin Brown, former chairman of the Consumer Services Panel of the Financial Services Authority. The couple have a daughter, and Alibhai-Brown has a son from a previous marriage.  Alibhai-Brown describes herself as "a leftie liberal, anti-racist, feminist, Muslim. part-Pakistani...person".

Career and views
A journalist on the New Statesman magazine in the early 1980s, Alibhai-Brown contributes a weekly column to The Independent. She has also written for The Guardian, The Observer, The New York Times, Time magazine, Newsweek, and the Daily Mail, and has appeared on the current affairs TV shows Dateline London and The Wright Stuff. Alibhai-Brown has won awards for her journalism, including Media Personality of the Year in 2000 (awarded by the Ethnic Multicultural Media Academy (EMMA)), the George Orwell Prize for Political Journalism in 2002, and the EMMA Award for Journalism in 2004.

Alibhai-Brown was a research fellow at the Institute for Public Policy Research (IPPR), a think tank associated with New Labour, from 1996 to 2001. She ended her connection with the Labour Party over the 2003 war in Iraq and other issues, and supported the Liberal Democrats in the 2005 and 2010 general elections. She is senior research associate at the Foreign Policy Centre, an honorary fellow at Liverpool John Moores University, and honorary visiting professor at Cardiff and Lincoln Universities.

In the New Year Honours 2001, Alibhai-Brown was appointed a Member of the Order of the British Empire (MBE) "for services to journalism". In 2003, Benjamin Zephaniah's public refusal of an OBE inspired her to return the award. She wrote that her decision had been made partly in a growing spirit of republicanism and partly in protest at the Labour government, particularly its conduct of the war in Iraq, and she has since criticised the British honours system as "beyond repair".

In May 2011, Alibhai-Brown wrote in The Independent that Muslims and others should stop focusing solely on the wrongdoings of Israel, saying that "We Muslims need to accept our burdens too." She also said that, "It is no longer morally justifiable for activists to target only Israel and either ignore or find excuses for corrupt, murderous Arab despots. That kind of selectivity discredits pro-Palestinian campaigners and dishonours the principles of equality and human rights." Brown previously condemned ethnic minority campaigners against racism failing to mention white victims of racially motivated crimes, suggesting they were guilty of double standards. Highlighting cases such as the murder of Ross Parker, Alibhai-Brown wrote: "Our values are worthless unless all victims of these senseless deaths matter equally", adding "to treat some victims as more worthy of condemnation than others is unforgivable and a betrayal of anti-racism itself".

In May 2012, Alibhai-Brown received an anonymous three-page letter alleging that while the sender was a schoolgirl in the 1970s she (the anonymous sender) had been sexually abused by veteran BBC presenter Stuart Hall. After Alibhai-Brown passed the letter to police, an investigation was initiated, culminating in Hall being arrested and charged with multiple counts of sexual assault. On 16 April 2013, Hall pleaded guilty to sexually assaulting 13 girls, aged from nine to 17, during the period 1967–86. The police credited Alibhai-Brown's actions as instrumental in triggering an investigation into Hall's past.

In 2016, Alibhai-Brown won the Columnist of the Year Broadsheet at the British Press Awards.

Criticism
Alibhai-Brown has attracted criticism for her views. Michael Wharton has accused her of an excessive pursuit of political correctness: "At 3.6 degrees on the Alibhai-Brown scale, it sets off a shrill scream that will not stop until you’ve pulled yourself together with a well-chosen anti-racist slogan."

Stephen Pollard accused her of racism and called her opinions "utterly vile" in The Jewish Chronicle in June 2008. In October 2009, Luciana Berger, MP and then director of Labour Friends of Israel, criticised Alibhai-Brown for writing in her column: "All three parties were lavishly entertained by the over-influential Friends of Israel." Berger said that Alibhai-Brown had not attended the LFI event or provided any evidence to sustain her comment. Berger insisted the hospitality ("house wine or orange juice and chips. Crisps and peanuts if you got to a bowl in time") was not lavish.

Select bibliography
 The Colour of Love: Mixed Race Relationships (with Anne Montague) (1992). London: Virago. 
 Racism (Points of View), (with Colin Brown) (1992). Hodder Wayland. 
 No Place Like Home (1995). London: Virago. 
 True Colours (1999). London: Institute for Public Policy Research. 
 Who Do We Think We Are? Imagining the New Britain (2000). London: Penguin. 
 After Multiculturalism (2000). London: Foreign Policy Centre. 
 Mixed Feelings: The Complex Lives of Mixed Race Britons (2001). London: Women's Press. 
 Some of My Best Friends Are... (2004). London: Politico's. 
 The Settler’s Cookbook: A Memoir of Love, Migration and Food (2008). Portobello Books. New edition (2010) Granta Books. 
 Refusing the Veil (2014). Biteback Publishing. 
 Exotic England; The Making of a curious Nation (2015). Portobello. 
 In Defence of Political Correctness (2018). Biteback Publishing. 
 Ladies Who Punch: Fifty trailblazing women whose stories you should know (2020). Biteback Publishing.

References

External links
Official website
Columns at The Independent
Column archive at The Guardian
Column archive at New Statesman
Published articles at Journalisted

1949 births
Living people
Alumni of Linacre College, Oxford
British Asian writers
Ugandan people of Indian descent
British columnists
British women columnists
British social commentators
British feminists
British Ismailis
British people of Indian descent
British republicans
British women journalists
London Evening Standard people
Makerere University alumni
I (newspaper) journalists
Members of the Order of the British Empire
People from Kampala
The Independent people
Ugandan emigrants to the United Kingdom
Ugandan feminists
Ugandan Ismailis
Ugandan women columnists
Naturalised citizens of the United Kingdom
British newspaper journalists
Khoja Ismailism